Vladislav "Lale" Lučić (born August 7, 1941) is a Serbian former professional basketball coach and player.

Biography
He won 2 National Championships with Red Star Belgrade in 1992–93 and 1993–94 season and National Cup with KK Partizan in 1998–99 season. He was also head coach of Germany at Eurobasket 1995 and Eurobasket 1997.

Career achievements

Men's Basketball 
 YUBA League champion: 2  (with Crvena zvezda: 1992–93, 1993–94)
 FR Yugoslav Cup winner: 1  (with Partizan: 1998–99)
 Yugoslav Super Cup winner: 1 (with Crvena zvezda: 1993)

Women's Basketball 
 Yugoslav League champion: 3  (with Partizan: 1983–84, 1984–85 and with Crvena zvezda: 1988–89)
 Yugoslav Cup winner: 1  (with Partizan: 1984–85)
 Serbia and Montenegro League champion: 1  (with Crvena zvezda: 2003–04)
 Serbia & Montenegro Cup winner: 2  (with Crvena zvezda: 2002–03, 2003–04)
 French League champion: 2  (with Challes-les-Eaux Savoie: 1990–91, 1991–92)

National team's coaching record

See also 
 List of FIBA AfroBasket winning head coaches
 List of Red Star Belgrade basketball coaches
 List of KK Partizan head coaches

References

External links 
 Sportski spomenar #473

1941 births
Living people
Basketball players from Belgrade
Serbian men's basketball coaches
Serbian men's basketball players
Serbian basketball executives and administrators
KK Crvena zvezda head coaches
KK Crvena zvezda players
KK Crvena zvezda youth coaches
KK Crvena Zvezda executives
ŽKK Crvena zvezda coaches
KK Partizan coaches
ŽKK Partizan coaches
Members of the Assembly of KK Crvena zvezda
Serbian expatriate basketball people in France
Serbian expatriate basketball people in Germany
Serbian expatriate basketball people in Nigeria
Serbian expatriate basketball people in Ivory Coast
Yugoslav expatriate sportspeople in Germany
Yugoslav men's basketball players